Beacon Tower, formerly Colston Tower, is a high-rise building located on Colston Avenue,  in the centre of Bristol, England. The building was designed in 1961, but not completed until 1973. It rises  and has 15 floors of offices. The building had been named after the Bristol-born slave trader, philanthropist and Member of Parliament Edward Colston.

A clock was added to the building around 1996.

On 11 June 2020, the "Colston Tower" lettering was removed from the tower in response to the ongoing George Floyd protests in the United Kingdom. Four days earlier, the nearby statue of Edward Colston had been pulled down and thrown into Bristol Harbour.

On 26 November 2020, the building's new name, Beacon Tower, was announced.

See also
 List of tallest buildings and structures in Bristol

References

External links
www.colstontower.co.uk (archived 3 October 2016)

Buildings and structures in Bristol
Clock towers in the United Kingdom
Towers in Bristol
Office buildings completed in 1973
Name changes due to the George Floyd protests